Merritt Peak can refer to the following mountains in the United States:

Merritt Peak (Idaho), in Custer County
Merritt Peak (South Dakota), a mountain in Pennigton County, South Dakota

See also
 Mount Merritt, Montana